Bertele is a German surname. Notable people with the surname include:

Ludwig Bertele (1900–1985), German optics constructor
Michael von Bertele (born 1956), British Army officer

German-language surnames